Turang is a 1957 Indonesian drama film directed by Bachtiar Siagian.  The film won four awards at the Indonesian Film Festival in 1960, including Best Film.

Accolades

References 

Indonesian-language films
1957 films
1957 drama films
Indonesian drama films